Aidankaatajat eli heidän jälkeensä vedenpaisumus is a 1982 Finnish comedy film drama directed and written by Olli Soinio. Starring Erkki Pajala, Martti Kainulainen and Toivo Tuomainen.

The film premiered on 20 August 1982 in Finland. The film premiered in Sweden in March 1983.

The film was produced by Sateenkaarifilmi and distributed by Suomi-Filmi.

Cast
 Erkki Pajala as Tauno Hartman
 Martti Kainulainen as Oiva Vaittinen
 Toivo Tuomainen as Onni Akseli Kurki
 Anselmi
 Matti Aro as Distinguished guest
 Helen Elde
 Tuija Ernamo
 Asser Fagerström
 Susanna Haavisto as Kirsti
 Aulis Hämäläinen
 Heikki Holopainen
 Heikki Huopainen as Male nurse
 Seija Kareinen
 Lilga Kovanko
 Matti Kuortti
 Martin Kurtén as City legislator
 Soli Labbart as Old housemaid
 Kauko Laurikainen as Policeman
 Paavo Liski as Psychiatrist
 Olavi Naaralainen
 Voitto Nurmi
 Arja Pessa
 Tuija Piepponen
 Paavo Piskonen
 Erik Pöysti
 Aulis Rosendahl
 Ismo Saario as Stepson
 Elvi Saarnio
 Antti Tarkiainen
 Matti Tuominen
 Uolevi Vahteristo
 Matti Varjo
 Arno Virtanen
 Pauli Virtanen

See also
 List of Finnish films

References

External links
 

1980s Finnish-language films
1982 films
1982 comedy-drama films
Finnish comedy-drama films
1982 comedy films
1982 drama films